The Havana Shipyards are located in the Bay of Havana, Cuba. They assert the capacity for new construction of pilot boats and barges to 70m, as well as repairs with certification of ISO 9001.

External links
 Curaçao Drydock Company (CDM)
 Caribbean Drydock Company (CDC)

Manufacturing companies of Cuba
Economy of Havana
Buildings and structures in Havana